Laurel Park is a census-designated place (CDP) in Henry County, Virginia, United States. The population was 675 at the 2010 census. It is part of the Martinsville Micropolitan Statistical Area.

Geography
Laurel Park is located at  (36.689798, −79.790791).

According to the United States Census Bureau, the CDP has a total area of 1.3 square miles (3.3 km2), of which, 1.3 square miles (3.3 km2) of it is land and 0.78% is water.  Laurel Park is not to be confused with the housing estate within the Laurel region of Henrico County, Virginia.  Also, Henry County is not to be confused with Henrico County, also in Virginia. Henrico is a largely suburban county surrounding Richmond north of the James River.

Demographics
As of the census of 2000, there were 781 people, 331 households, and 231 families residing in the CDP. The population density was 614.4 people per square mile (237.4/km2). There were 342 housing units at an average density of 269.0/sq mi (104.0/km2). The racial makeup of the CDP was 33.29% White, 64.40% African American, 0.38% Asian, 0.13% Pacific Islander, 1.15% from other races, and 0.64% from two or more races. Hispanic or Latino of any race were 1.92% of the population.

There were 331 households, out of which 34.1% had children under the age of 18 living with them, 52.3% were married couples living together, 15.7% had a female householder with no husband present, and 30.2% were non-families. 27.5% of all households were made up of individuals, and 5.4% had someone living alone who was 65 years of age or older. The average household size was 2.36 and the average family size was 2.87.

In the CDP, the population was spread out, with 24.7% under the age of 18, 9.6% from 18 to 24, 30.1% from 25 to 44, 29.1% from 45 to 64, and 6.5% who were 65 years of age or older. The median age was 36 years. For every 100 females, there were 87.3 males. For every 100 females age 18 and over, there were 80.9 males.

The median income for a household in the CDP was $42,361, and the median income for a family was $47,143. Males had a median income of $29,904 versus $23,363 for females. The per capita income for the CDP was $17,413. About 2.7% of families and 3.8% of the population were below the poverty line, including none of those under the age of eighteen or sixty-five or over.

References

Census-designated places in Henry County, Virginia
Census-designated places in Virginia
Martinsville, Virginia micropolitan area